Philipp Zeiger (born 8 May 1990) is a German footballer who plays as a centre-back for VSG Altglienicke.

Career
Zeiger began his career with Dynamo Dresden and made his debut in a 3. Liga match against SV Wehen Wiesbaden on 28 July 2009, coming on as a substitute for Halil Savran. He left Dynamo in July 2010, joining VFC Plauen on loan, a deal that was made permanent a year later. After two seasons with Plauen he returned to the 3. Liga, signing for newly promoted Hallescher FC. At the end of the 2013–14 season, he signed for Rot-Weiss Essen.

With Rot-Weiss Essen Zeiger won the Lower Rhine Cup in 2015 and 2016.

External links
 
 

1990 births
Living people
German footballers
Association football defenders
Dynamo Dresden players
Dynamo Dresden II players
Hallescher FC players
Rot-Weiss Essen players
VSG Altglienicke players
3. Liga players
Regionalliga players
Footballers from Dresden